Emilio Palucci  (born on May 21, 1985 in Ribeirão Preto), is a retired Brazilian football defender. After retiring from football, Emilio became a physiotherapist.

References

External links
 Profile at FFA website

1985 births
Living people
Brazilian footballers
Association football defenders
Brazilian expatriate footballers
FC Ararat Yerevan players
Expatriate footballers in Armenia
People from Ribeirão Preto
Armenian Premier League players
Footballers from São Paulo (state)